Joannes or Johannes De Laet (Latinized as Ioannes Latius) (1581 in Antwerp – buried 15 December 1649, in Leiden) was a Dutch geographer and director of the Dutch West India Company. Philip Burden  called his History of the New World, "...arguably the finest description of the Americas published in the seventeenth century" and "...one of the foundation maps of Canada". De Laet was the first to print maps with the names Manhattan, New Amsterdam (now New York City) and Massachusetts.

Life

De Laet was born in Antwerp between September and December 1581, a son of cloth merchant Hans De Laet. In 1584, upon the fall of Antwerp to Spanish troops, the family, like tens of thousands of Protestant Flemings, fled to the Northern Netherlands and settled in Amsterdam. There Johannes attended the Latin school. He matriculated as a student of Theology and Philosophy at the University of Leiden in 1597. One of his teachers there was the great humanist scholar Joseph Justus Scaliger, with whom he maintained a correspondence until the latter's death. After his graduation, his father sent him to London in 1603 to gain experience as a merchant. There he married Jacobmijntje van Loor, the daughter of a well-to-do Anglo-Dutch merchant, but returned to Leiden in 1607 upon her too early death. On 7 May 1608 he married Maria Boudewijns van Berlicum in Leiden. De Laet increased his fortune by investing in land reclamations and overseas trade and became one of the founding directors of the Dutch West Indies Company in 1620, an office he retained for the rest of his life. The city of Leiden sent him as an elder-delegate to the great Synod of Dort (1618–1619).

In his leisure time, De Laet spent much of his time in his study room, well-stocked with books, manuscripts, maps, globes and paintings. He published widely on topics ranging from church history to world history. He played a crucial role in the 1648 publication of Historia Naturalis Brasiliae, a compendium of research on the flora and fauna of Brazil by Georg Marcgraf and Willem Piso, whose patron was Johan Maurits, governor of Dutch Brazil. Marcgraf had written his portion of the work in a secret cipher, but died before the work was published. De Laet decoded it. A further contribution by De Laet was his preface to this important work, which emphasized the comparability of Northeast Brazil with other areas with a similar climate. The work subsequently circulated widely in northern Europe and beyond in scientific circles, and was not supplanted as an authoritative text for a hundred fifty years. He also edited Pliny's Historia naturalis and Vitruvius' De architectura, wrote a detailed account of the New World and compiled an (unpublished) Old English-Latin dictionary – to mention just a selection of his forty publications. His correspondents include the English antiquaries William Camden, Sir Henry Spelman, Sir William Boswell, Abraham Wheelock, Sir Simonds D'Ewes, James Usher, Patrick Young, John Morris, and the Danish antiquary Ole Worm.

De Laet died in December 1649 while in The Hague. He was buried in the Pieterskerk in Leiden on the 14th, next to Maria Boudewijns who had died in 1633.

Works

History of the New World
His History of the New World was published  in several editions by Bonaventure & Abraham Elseviers, Leiden. The first edition was published in Dutch in 1625 as
Nieuwe Wereldt ofte Beschrijvinghe van West-Indien, uit veelerhande Schriften ende Aen-teekeningen van verscheyden Natien; a second edition also in Dutch, came out in 1630 as Beschrijvinghe van West-Indien door Joannes De Laet. Tweede druk: In ontallycke placesen verbetert, vermeerdert, met eenige nieuwe caerten, beelden van verscheijden dieren ende planten
verciert. 

A Latin edition from 1633, prepared by himself, was entitled Novus Orbis seu descriptionis Indiae Occidentalis Libri XVIII authore Joanne De Laet Antverp. Novis tabulis geographicis et variis animantium, Plantarum Fructuumque iconibus illustrata; in 1640 he published a French edition, in his own translation, as L'Histoire du Nouveau Monde ou description des Indes Occidentales, contenant dix-huict livres, enrichi de nouvelles tables geographiqiues & figures des animaux, plantes & fruicts.

Each successive edition had significantly updated maps.

Other works
 The Empire of the Great Mogul, translated by J.S. Hoyland with S.N. Bannerjee.  Taraporevela, Bombay, 1928. Reissued Munshiram Manoharlal, New Delhi, 1975, .
 "Persia", 1633

Notes and references

Notes

References
 J. A. F. Bekkers, Correspondence of John Morris with Johannes de Laet (1634–1649) (Assen, 1970).
 Rolf H. Bremmer Jr and P. G. Hoftijzer, eds., Johannes de Laet (1581-169): A Leiden Polymath, special issue of Lias. Sources and Documents Relating to the Early Modern History of Ideas, vol. 25/2 (1998), 135–229, with contributions on the contents of his scholarly correspondence, his role in the Synod of Dort, his polemics with Hugo Grotius on the origin of the Native Americans, on his personal library, and on his Vitruvius edition.
 Rolf H. Bremmer Jr, '"Mine is Bigger than Yours": The Anglo-Saxon Collections of Johannes de Laet (1581-1649) and Sir Symonds D'Ewes', Anglo-Saxon Books and Their Readers, ed. Thomas N. Hall and Donald Scragg (Kalamazoo, MI, 2008), 136–174.
 Oxford Dictionary of National Biography
 Genealogical date from Descendants of Johannes de Laet (in Dutch)

External links
 Tierra Firma item Nuevo Reyno de Granada atque Popayan, a map of New Granada from L'Histoire du Nouveau Monde...
 Map of New England, 1624
 Open Library. Joannes de Laet 1593 - 1649

1581 births
1649 deaths
Burials at Pieterskerk, Leiden
Dutch geographers
Linguists from the Netherlands
De Laet, Joannes
Leiden University alumni
Academic staff of Leiden University
Administrators of the Dutch West India Company
Scientists from Antwerp
Businesspeople from Antwerp
Participants in the Synod of Dort
17th-century Dutch cartographers